Herb Dickieson (born March 8, 1954) is a retired physician and a former educator and politician in Prince Edward Island, Canada. Dickieson was the first and, to date, only member of the New Democratic Party of Prince Edward Island to have sat in the Legislative Assembly.

Dickieson was raised in New Glasgow on a small family farm. He graduated from the University of Prince Edward Island with his B.Sc. in 1979 and received a B.Ed. in 1982.  Dickieson taught high school in Calgary, Alberta for one year before entering medical school at Dalhousie University, from which he graduated with his medical degree in 1987. Dickieson interned in New Brunswick and in Prince Edward Island and established a family medicine practise in O'Leary.

Dickieson was elected leader of the Island New Democrats in March 1995, and led the party in the 1996 and 2000 provincial elections, seeking to be a Member of the Legislature for District 25, West Point-Bloomfield. He was successful in the 1996 election, but was defeated in the 2000 election. Dickieson led the party through the 1990s, but resigned two years after his personal electoral defeat.

Dickieson was a popular politician during his term, even among non-New Democrats, as a voice for change. He was encouraged by many members to run for the federal New Democratic Party in the 2004 federal election and again provincially, he had refused until he announced on September 12, 2014 that he would seek the NDP nomination for Egmont for the 2015 federal election. Dickieson was nominated as the candidate in October 2014. On October 19, 2015, Dickieson was defeated in the election, finishing third behind the winner, Liberal Bobby Morrissey and Conservative incumbent Gail Shea.

Dickieson was involved in local and provincial issues, including concern over the closing of rural post offices, the fate of farmers, and the quality of education, particularly among children. He has served on boards for the promotion of a community youth centre, Chamber of Commerce board of directors, and as Chief of Medical Staff at the Community Hospital in O'Leary. He is also a Past President of the Medical Society of Prince Edward Island.

He resides with his wife Kathleen and family in Howlan.

Electoral record

References

1954 births
Living people
University of Prince Edward Island alumni
Dalhousie University alumni
People from Queens County, Prince Edward Island
New Democratic Party of Prince Edward Island MLAs
New Democratic Party of Prince Edward Island leaders
New Democratic Party candidates for the Canadian House of Commons
Prince Edward Island candidates for Member of Parliament